The Balochistan Judicial Academy is an agency of the Government of Balochistan in Quetta for legal training. The Academy was established in 2010 by Balochistan Judicial Academy Act 2010 passed by Balochistan Assembly. The Academy provides pre-service and in-service training to the judicial officers and court personnel. The management and administration of the Academy are run by the board under leadership of the Chief Justice of Balochistan High Court and an appointed Director-General.

See also 
 Federal Judicial Academy
 Khyber Pakhtunkhwa Judicial Academy
 Punjab Judicial Academy
 Sindh Judicial Academy
 Gilgit-Baltistan Judicial Academy

References

External links 
 Balochistan High Court

Legal organizations based in Pakistan
2010 establishments in Pakistan
Government agencies of Balochistan, Pakistan
Government agencies established in 2010